Assam Skill University is a public state university located at Mangaldai, Darrang district, Assam, India. The university was established by The Assam Skill University Act, 2020 which was passed by the Assam Legislative Assembly on 3 September 2020 and received the assent of the Governor of Assam on 12 October 2020 On 7 August 2021, former IAS officer, who had served as the Additional Chief Secretary of Assam, Subhash Chandra Das was appointed as the Vice Chancellor of the University. The Chief Minister of Assam by virtue of his office is the chancellor of the university.

Academics 
The university offers various undergraduate, postgraduate, diploma, and certificate courses in various fields, such as agriculture, engineering, healthcare, hospitality, tourism, media, and communication. The university also provides various facilities and services for the overall development of the students, such as sports facilities, hostel accommodation, medical facilities, and career counseling services.

History
On 15 February 2021, Chief Minister Sarbananda Sonowal laid the foundation stone of Assam Skill University at Mangaldoi, Darrang. He was accompanied by minister of Skill, Employment and entrepreneurship department Chandra Mohan Patowary and other dignitaries. 

The Assam Skill University will be set up under the external-aided project funded by the Asian Development Bank.

References

Universities in Assam
2021 establishments in Assam
Educational institutions established in 2021
State universities in India